Jared P. Scott is an American documentary writer, director, and producer. His films include The Age of Consequences, Requiem for the American Dream, The Great Green Wall and Who Killed Robert Wone?

Career
Jared P. Scott is the director and executive producer of Who Killed Robert Wone?, a Peacock original documentary about the mysterious murder of Robert Eric Wone.

Jared is the writer, director and producer of The Great Green Wall. The film features Inna Modja following The Great Green Wall initiative and is executive produced by Fernando Meirelles (City of God) and Biz Stone. 

He is the director and executive producer of Humanity Has Not Yet Failed. Based on the words by Greta Thunberg, the film was released by New York Times Opinion and won a News & Documentary Emmy Award.

Jared is the writer, director and producer of The Age of Consequences. The film was nominated for a News & Documentary Emmy Award for Outstanding Politics and Government Documentary.

He is one of three co-writers/directors/producers of Requiem for the American Dream, a NYTimes Critics' Pick.

Jared is one of three editors of the book Requiem for the American Dream: The 10 Principles of Concentration of Wealth & Power authored by Noam Chomsky, which ranked No. 6 on The New York Times Bestseller list for paperback nonfiction the week of April 16, 2017.

Jared is the writer, director, and producer of Disruption, a Vimeo Staff Pick following the People's Climate March and Do the Math featuring environmentalist Bill McKibben.

Jared is the writer, director, and producer of Money is Material featuring currency collage artist Mark Wagner.

He is the writer, director, and producer The Artificial Leaf, a jury prize winner at the Focus Forward competition at the Sundance Film Festival.

Filmography 
Who Killed Robert Wone? (2023), writer, director, executive producer
Humanity Has Not Yet Failed (2021), writer, director, executive producer
The Great Green Wall (2019), writer, director, producer
The Age of Consequences (2016/17), writer, director, producer
 Disobedience (2016), producer
 Requiem for the American Dream (2015/16), writer, director, producer
 Disruption (2014), writer, director, producer
 Impossible (2014), writer, director, producer
 Money is Material (2014), writer, director, producer
 Do the Math (2013), writer, director, producer
 The Artificial Leaf (2013), writer, director, producer
 Split: A Deeper Divide (2012), producer
 Split: A Divided America (2008), producer

Books
  Co-created and edited by Jared P. Scott.

References

Living people
American documentary film directors
American documentary film producers
American non-fiction writers
Year of birth missing (living people)